Xavier de Magallon (1866–1956) was a French poet, translator and politician.

Early life
Xavier de Magallon d'Agens was born in Marseille, Provence, France on April 2, 1866. During World War I, he volunteered to serve in the French Army. He received the Croix de Guerre for his service.

Career
De Magallon served as a member of the Chamber of Deputies from 1919 to 1924, representing Hérault. He ran as a property owner and defended free enterprise. He believed in harmony between business and labour.

De Magallon was a poet whose work was published in literary journals. He also translated texts from Latin into French. For example, he translated Virgil's Eclogues in 1943.

De Magallon has been described as a "Catholic populist".

Death
De Magallon died in 1956 in Marseille.

References

1866 births
1956 deaths
Writers from Marseille
French people of World War I
Recipients of the Croix de Guerre 1914–1918 (France)
19th-century French poets
Latin–French translators
Translators of Virgil
Politicians from Marseille